John Fritsche Sr. (born March 5, 1966) is an American former professional ice hockey player. He played with the United States men's national ice hockey team at the 1990 Men's World Ice Hockey Championships.

References

External links

1966 births
Living people
American people of Swiss descent
American men's ice hockey right wingers
EV Zug players
HC Ambrì-Piotta players
HC Lugano players
Moncton Hawks players
Ice hockey people from Cleveland
John, Sr.